Elbio Rosselli served as the President of the United Nations Security Council for the month of January 2016.  He is from Uruguay.

References

External links

Uruguayan politicians
Year of birth missing (living people)
Living people
Permanent Representatives of Uruguay to the United Nations
Place of birth missing (living people)